D121 may refer to:
 D121 road (Croatia), a state road connecting the island of Murter with D8 state road near Pirovac
 Jodel D.121, an aircraft